The women's 5000 metres at the 2022 World Athletics U20 Championships was held at the Estadio Olímpico Pascual Guerrero in Cali, Colombia on 6 August 2022.

19 athletes from 13 countries entered to the competition.

Records
U20 standing records prior to the 2022 World Athletics U20 Championships were as follows:

Results
The final race started at 16:27 on 6 August 2022. The results were as follows:

References

5000 metres women
Long distance running at the World Athletics U20 Championships